"Life" is a song written and produced by Ricky Nelson and performed by Rick Nelson & The Stone Canyon Band. The song reached #15 on the adult contemporary chart and #109 on the Billboard Hot 100 in 1971.

The song is featured on his 1972 album, Rudy the Fifth.

References

1971 songs
1971 singles
Songs written by Ricky Nelson
Ricky Nelson songs
Decca Records singles